Sissons is a British surname. 

Notable people who share this surname include:

A. T. S. Sissons (1888–1975), Australian pharmaceutical scientist and academic 
Colton Sissons (born 1993), Canadian ice hockey player
C. H. Sisson (1914–2003), British writer
Graham Sissons (born 1934), English footballer
John Sissons (football) (born 1945) English footballer 
John Sissons (1892–1969), author, judge and Canadian federal politician
Pat Sissons, a presenter on the Original 106 radio station
Peter Sissons (1942–2019), British broadcast journalist
Richard Sissons (1819–1893), New Zealand doctor
Robert Sissons (born 1988 in Stockport), English footballer

See also 
 Sisson, a surname